Bel Air is a neighborhood of Port-au-Prince, Haiti. It is a slum area of the city and suffers from poverty. Crime is widespread, and kidnappings and killings have created panic among the local population. The neighborhood is also noted for housing a community of artists and craftsmen who produce inspired by Haitian Vodou, such as flags.

History
Bel Air has served as a launching site for political demonstrations demanding the return of President Jean-Bertrand Aristide. In recent years it has been marred by political violence and massacres by police.

In the late 19th century, Bel Air was the preferred place of settlement for British West Indian migrants to Haiti, the largest group of which were Jamaicans.

On January 5, 2005 an uprising broke out and was suppressed by hundreds of Brazilian soldiers and special units of the Haitian National Police. Five persons were reported to have been killed. The trouble in the Bel Air area of the city was seen by the authorities as a major threat to the safety of the 2005 elections in Haiti.

The neighborhood was the most devastated area of Port-au-Prince after the 2010 Haiti earthquake.

Crime
At the end of 2011, the murder rate in Bel Air reached 50 murders per 100,000 residents, up from 19 murders per 100,000 residents in 2010.

References

External links

BelAirHaiti.net
UN occupies Bel Air in Haiti

Populated places in Haiti
Port-au-Prince